A summer village is a type of urban municipality in the Canadian province of Alberta that has a permanent population generally less than 300 permanent inhabitants, as well as seasonal (non-permanent) inhabitants.

Alberta has a total of 51 summer villages that had a cumulative population of 5,176 and an average population of 101 in Canada's 2016 Census of Population. Alberta's largest summer village is Sandy Beach with a population of 278, while Castle Island, Kapasiwin, and Point Alison are the smallest each with a population of 10.


History 
A summer village is a type of municipal status used in Alberta, Canada founded in 1913. It was used in resort areas that were mainly active in the summer and where most residents were seasonal. Cottage owners did not want to pay for municipal services that they didn't need but wished to have a voice in local government of the resort area.

Changes were made to the provincial laws to allow elections to be held in July and to allow seasonal residents to run for office and vote in the summer village without losing these same rights in their place of permanent residence.

In 1995, provincial legislation was changed to prevent the formation of new summer villages. The 54 summer villages that existed at the time were permitted to continue to operate as before.

List

Former summer villages 
Four other communities in Alberta have previously held summer village status – Alberta Beach, Chestermere Lake (now Chestermere), Edmonton Beach (now Spring Lake), and White Gull.

See also 
List of census divisions of Alberta
List of cities in Alberta
List of communities in Alberta
List of hamlets in Alberta
List of municipal districts in Alberta
List of municipalities in Alberta
List of resort villages in Saskatchewan
List of towns in Alberta
List of villages in Alberta

Notes

References

External links 
 Alberta Municipal Affairs
 Association of Summer Villages of Alberta

 
Summer village